Agtech may refer to:

 Agricultural technology
 Genetic engineering or applied genetics technology